Her Minor Thing is a romantic comedy is directed by Charles Matthau released in 2005, with screenplay written by Jim and Debra Meyers. The film stars Estella Warren, Christian Kane, and Michael Weatherly.

The script's working title was "Men Are Jerks".

Plot
Everything was going fine for hot young 25-year-old Jeana (Estella Warren) until her newscaster boyfriend accidentally revealed on TV that Jeana is still a virgin despite being in her mid 20s. Jeana is completely humiliated by this, and adding insult to injury is the fact that the revelation of her virginity has made her a target for every oversexed man in the immediate area, all of them determined to "make a real woman out of her". Noting dejectedly that since it was revealed that she is a virgin, every man who looks at her "wants a date", and all her optimistic romantic ideals have been shattered. Ultimately she cannot salvage her relationship with her newscaster boyfriend, but in the end, she does finally find a man, a photographer, who is decent enough to be the man to whom she finally loses her virginity.

Cast and crew

Cast

Production

The film was shot in 23 days, in June–July 2004.

Accolades
 2006 Special Jury Award - Christian Kane - Special Jury Prize Acting Achievement

References

External links
 
 
 
 Official Website
 Official MySpace

2005 films
American independent films
2005 romantic comedy films
Films about virginity
2005 independent films
2000s English-language films
Films directed by Charles Matthau
2000s American films
American romantic comedy films